21 & Over is the debut album by West Coast hip hop group, Tha Alkaholiks. It is highly praised, and has been described as "the quintessential West Coast party album." It has ten tracks, timed at only about 35 minutes, but it contains three singles, "Make Room," "Likwit" and "Mary Jane." None of these singles reached The Billboard Hot 100, but they all did well on the Hot Dance Music/Maxi-Singles Sales chart. The only single that contains vocals from anybody other than Tash and J-Ro is "Likwit," which features King Tee. King Tee is responsible for founding Tha Alkaholiks, and the track's title is a reference to the Likwit Crew that he created. Lootpack and Threat are the only other guest vocalists on this album, but production is provided by Tha Alkaholiks, King Tee, Lootpack and Derick "D. Pimp" Williams. Nu-Metal versions of 2 of their songs are on Loud Rocks, one with Crazy Town covered "Only When I'm Drunk" also on Crazy Town's 1999 album The Gift of Game, and "Make Room" featuring Sugar Ray.

Track listing 
All tracks written by Rico Smith, Eric Brooks and James Robinson, except where noted. 

Notes
  signifies a co-producer
  signifies an additional producer

Charts

Singles

References 

1993 debut albums
Tha Alkaholiks albums
Loud Records albums
RCA Records albums
Albums produced by Madlib